Dee may refer to:

People

Surname 
 Dee, an alternate spelling of the Welsh surname Day
 Dee, a romanization of several Chinese surnames, including:
 Those listed at Di (surname)
 Some Hokkien pronunciations of the surname Li
 Di Renjie  (630–700), Duke Wenhui of Liang, a Tang dynasty official
 Arthur Dee (1579–1651), a physician and alchemist
 Billy Dee, retired African American adult film actor
 Bob Dee (1933–1979), American football defensive end 
 Daisy Dee (born 1970), Dutch singer, actress and TV host
 Dave Dee (1943–2009), English singer-songwriter, musician, A&R manager, fundraiser and businessman
 Ed Dee (born 1940), American author
 Frances Dee (1909–2004), American actress
 Gerry Dee (born 1968), Canadian comedian
 Jack Dee (born 1961), British comedian
 Jeff Dee (born 1961), American artist and game designer
 Joey Dee (born 1940), American singer, of Joey Dee and the Starliters
 John Dee  (1527 – 1608 or 1609), English mathematician and alchemist
 John Dee (disambiguation) for other people with the name
 Kiki Dee (born 1947), English singer
 Kool Moe Dee (born 1962), American hip hop MC
 Leo Dee (1931–2004), American artist
 Marvin R. Dee (1917–1977), American lawyer, businessman, and politician
 Merri Dee (1936–2022), American journalist and philanthropist
 Mike Dee, American sports executive
 Mike Dee (baseball coach) (born 1958), American college baseball coach
 Mikkey Dee (born 1963), Swedish drummer with the band Motörhead
 Papa Dee (born 1966), Swedish rap, ragga and dancehall musician
 Roger Dee (1914–2004), American author
 Ruby Dee (1922–2014), African-American actress and activist
 Sandra Dee (1942–2005), American actress
 Simon Dee (1935–2009), British television interviewer and radio disc jockey

Given name 
 Diminutive for the name David, common in the UK and Ireland
 Dee Bradley Baker (born 1962), American voice actor
 Dee Brown (disambiguation)
 Dee Dowis (1968–2016), American football player
 Dee Dee Myers, first female White House press secretary
 Dee Dee Ramone, punk musician
 Dee Benson, American judge
 Dee Bradley Baker, American voice actor
 Dee Delaney (born 1995), American football player
Dee Duponte (1910/11–1971), Hawaii territorial politician
 Dee Gordon, American baseball player
 Dee Harvey (1965–2012), American R&B singer
 Dee Hepburn (born 1961), a Scottish former actress
 Dee Martin, American football player
 Dee Palmer (*1937), English musician
 Dee Roscioli, American actress
Dee Scarr, scuba diver and environmentalist in Bonaire
 Dee Snider, singer

Stage name or nickname 
 Dee (singer), Canadian
 Dee (artist), Swedish
 Dee (nickname), a list of people nicknamed "Dee"

Fictional characters 
 Judge Dee, a semi-fictional character based on Di Renjie, Duke Wenhui of Liang
 Anastasia Dualla or Dee, character from the television series Battlestar Galactica
 Deandra Reynolds, "Sweet Dee" of the television series It's Always Sunny in Philadelphia
 Dee Dee, Dexter's sister from the cartoon Dexter's Laboratory
 Dee, a secret character in the Darkstalkers fighting game series
 Gandra Dee, a Duck Tales character
 Waddle Dee, a Kirby character
 Deema, on the American animated television series Bubble Guppies
 Dee Thomas, from the sitcom What's Happening!!

Mascots
Dee, one of the mascots of PBS Kids since 2013

As an abbreviation
 Department of the Environment and Energy, Australia
 Dundee railway station, station code
 Yuzhno-Kurilsk Mendeleyevo Airport, IATA code
 Dead-end elimination

Other uses 
 De'e, a town in Longlin Various Nationalities Autonomous County, Guangxi, China
 Dee, a song in the album Blizzard of Ozz
 Dee (gender identity)
 A D-shaped electrode in a cyclotron
 A D-shaped ring, a D-ring or dee-ring
 The letter "D" in English alphabet#Letter names
 Dee, the concept car BMW i Vision Dee

See also 
 D (disambiguation)
 River Dee (disambiguation)
 HMS Dee, Royal Navy ships 
 Dee Dee

Hypocorisms